Eduard "Eddy" Scharf (born 7 November 1953 in Cologne) is a German professional poker player best known for winning two World Series of Poker bracelets.

Scharf, who still maintains his job as a professional airline pilot, began playing poker professionally in 1995.
In 2001 and 2003, he won both of his two bracelets in the limit Omaha events at World Series of Poker (WSOP).
In 2004, Scharf finished in the money in the $10,000 No Limit Hold'em Main Event coming in 15th place out of a field of 2,576 players, winning $275,000.

As of 2011, Scharf's total live tournament winnings exceed $1,200,000. His 15 cashes as the WSOP account for $785,269 of those winnings.

Eddy Scharf is a Full Tilt Professional.

World Series of Poker bracelets

Notes

External links
FullTilt Poker profile
Pokerpages profile

1953 births
German poker players
Living people
World Series of Poker bracelet winners
Commercial aviators
Lufthansa people